The 2006 British Superbike season was held from 24 March to 30 September.

Races

Championship Standings

British Superbike Championship

British Supersport Championship

National Superstock Championship

External links
 BSB Website

British Superbike Championship
British Superbike
Superbike